St. Charles College is a Catholic Secondary School located at 1940 Hawthorne Drive in Greater Sudbury, Ontario. The school motto is "Goodness Discipline and Knowledge" and is based on the Basilian motto, Bonitatem et disciplinam et scientiam doce me, which comes from Psalm 119 of the Bible `- Teach me good judgement and knowledge: for I believe your commandments.

On April 30, 2020, the Canadian Supreme Court rejected an appeal from the Basilian Fathers of Toronto to deny payment of nearly $2.5 million including $500,000 in punitive damages, to sex abuse victim Rod MacLeod. MacLeod, who was previously awarded this compensation by a jury in April 2018, was sexually abused by former St. Charles teacher Father William Hodgson Marshall. when he was a student at St. Charles in the 1960s. In 2011, Marshall pled guilty to committing abuse he committed in Sudbury and other Catholic high schools in Windsor and Toronto between 1952 and 1986. MacLeod's case was profiled in the 2019 documentary film Prey.

Alumni
 Brian Bigger, current mayor of Greater Sudbury
 Rob MacDonald, appeared on The Ultimate Fighter 2; retired professional Mixed Martial Artist
 Dr. Piers Nash

See also
List of high schools in Ontario

References

External links
 St. Charles College

Catholic secondary schools in Ontario
High schools in Greater Sudbury
Educational institutions established in 1951
1951 establishments in Ontario